Sphaerolobium rostratum is a species of flowering plant in the family Fabaceae and is endemic to the south of Western Australia. It is an erect to sprawling shrub or subshrub with slender stems, tapering linear leaves and loose racemes of pink and cream-coloured flowers.

Description

Taxonomy
Sphaerolobium rostratum was first formally described in 1998 by Ryonen Butcher in the journal Nuytsia from specimens collected near Bow Bridge in 1997. The specific epithet (rostratum) means "beaked", referring to the tip of the keel petals.

Distribution and habitat
This species of pea grows in winter-wet swamps and along creek lines mostly in the Walpole-Nornalup National Park in the Jarrah Forest and Warren bioregions of southern Western Australia.

Conservation status
Sphaerolobium rostratum is listed as "not threatened" by the Government of Western Australia Department of Biodiversity, Conservation and Attractions.

References

rostratum
Eudicots of Western Australia
Plants described in 1998